Zakham is a 1994 Maldivian film directed by Easa Shareef. Produced by Aslam Rasheed under Slam Studio, the film stars Hassan Afeef and Aishath Shiranee in lead roles.

Premise
Nadhiya (Aishath Shiranee) along with her family goes to a nearby uninhabited island for picnic, where she meets Asif (Hassan Afeef). She encounters a bitterful interaction with him and is loathed by his presence until he saves her from a group of thugs. This softens her hatred towards him though the tables were changed where Asif suspects her change of intention as a part of her revenge plan. The trip ends when they both reunite and starts longing for each other. Shortly after, they start dating though their happiness is short-lived as her father, Moosafulhu (Chilhiya Moosa Manik) is coerced by his business partner, Ibrahimfulhu (Ibrahim Shakir) to arrange their children's marriage in order to strengthen their friendship.

Moosafulhu announces his disapproval towards their relationship as he considers Asif to be raised in a more wealthier family and accuses all his heroic moments to be his masterplan to win Nadhiya's heart. He further blames the death of his wife on Asif's father, Hussain Manik, the manager of Ibrahimfulhu, as he refused to financially help Moosafulhu when his wife was on the verge of dying in childbirth. Moosafulhu forces her to marry Ibrahimfulhu's son, Jameel, who is later revealed to be the leader of the thugs who initially once tried to rape Nadhiya.

Cast 
 Hassan Afeef as Asif
 Aishath Shiranee as Nadhiya
 Chilhiya Moosa Manik as Moosafulhu; Nadhiya's father
 Easa Shareef as Nadheem; Nadhiya's brother
 Hassan Latheef
 Arifa Ibrahim as Shareefa; the wife of a wealthy businessman and Asif’s mother
 Riyaz
 Fathimath Mufliha as Azeeza; the maid working at Nadhiya's house
 Hussain Shibau 
 Mohamed Aboobakuru as Jameel
 Ibrahim Shakir as Ibrahimfulhu; business partner of Moosafulhu and Jameel’s father
 Aminath Ahmed Didi as Nadhiya's mother who dies in childbirth

Soundtrack

Response
Upon release, the film received critical and commercial success where the story and its narrations by Chilhiya Moosa Manik were particularly praised by the critics. During the time of its release, most of its songs become chartbusters.

Accolades

References

Maldivian drama films
1994 films
Films directed by Easa Shareef
1994 drama films
Dhivehi-language films